Walter II may refer to:

 Walter II of Brienne
 Walter II de Clifford
 Walter II, Lord of Egmond
 Walter II Grenier